is the main train station for the town of Lisieux, Normandy, France.

It was built by Chemins de Fer de l'Ouest in 1855. The station is built in a Y shape and is situated on the Mantes-la-Jolie–Cherbourg railway main line from Paris to Caen and Cherbourg. The station is also served by trains to Trouville-Deauville. Lisieux has one other station: the Le Grand-Jardin on the line to Trouville-Deauville.

References

External links
 

Railway stations in Calvados
Gare de Lisieux
Railway stations in France opened in 1855
Gare de Lisieux